Charles Calisher is professor emeritus of microbiology at the College of Veterinary Medicine & Biomedical Sciences at Colorado State University.

Education and career 
Calisher received a bachelor's degree in bacteriology from the Philadelphia College of Pharmacy and Science, a master's degree in biology and gnotobiosis from the University of Notre Dame, and a Ph.D. in Microbiology from Georgetown University. His research interests include ecology and epidemiology, viral diagnostics, viral taxonomy, viral evolution of roboviruses, arboviruses, and hantaviruses.

References 

American microbiologists
Colorado State University faculty
Living people
University of the Sciences alumni
Notre Dame College of Arts and Letters alumni
Georgetown University Graduate School of Arts and Sciences alumni
Year of birth missing (living people)